Headlines is a 1925 American silent adventure and crime drama film directed by Edward H. Griffith and starring Alice Joyce and Malcolm McGregor. It was distributed through Pathé Exchange.

Plot
As described in a film magazine reviews, Phyllis Dale, young widowed authoress and newspaper writer, is respected and admired by Lawrence Emmett. Bobby, her young flapper daughter, has an interesting “line” which she uses on all men. When she tries it on Emmett, he whims her. Phyllis thinks Bobby has supplanted her in his affections and decides to step aside in Bobby’s interest. Soon after, Bobby innocently steps in for a moment to the apartment of one of her loose-moraled friends. His wife is looking for a co-respondent in her forthcoming divorce proceedings. Phyllis accidentally learns where Bobby is and hastens to the apartment, only to become enmeshed herself. Bobby, thoroughly and sincerely conscience stricken by the turn of affairs and realizing how much her mother was willing to sacrifice for her, vindicates Phyllis in the eyes of Emmett, who has followed her to the apartment, and marries the editor of the local newspaper who has suppressed the scandalous headlines.

Cast
Alice Joyce as Phyllis Dale
Malcolm McGregor as Lawrence Emmett
Virginia Lee Corbin as Bobby Dale
Harry T. Morey as Donald Austin
Ruby Blaine as Stella Austin
Elliott Nugent as Roger Hillman

Preservation
Prints of Headlines survive in the Library of Congress and EYE Film Institute Netherlands.

References

External links

1925 films
American silent feature films
Films directed by Edward H. Griffith
American black-and-white films
American adventure drama films
1925 crime drama films
American crime drama films
1920s adventure drama films
Associated Exhibitors films
1920s American films
Silent American drama films
Silent adventure films